Hileithia invidiosa is a moth in the family Crambidae. It was described by Harrison Gray Dyar Jr. in 1914. It is found in Panama.

The wingspan is about 18 mm. The wings are whitish, slightly tinged with straw. There is a brown marginal shade.

References

Moths described in 1914
Spilomelinae